Ridgeway is an English surname.

People
Aden Ridgeway (born 1962), Australian politician
Brian Ridgeway (born 1984), Canadian football player
C. W. Ridgeway, American football coach in the United States
Charles Ridgeway DD (1841–1927), the Bishop of Chichester from 1908 to 1919
Dante Ridgeway (born 1984), former American football wide receiver
Elizabeth Ridgeway (died 1684), English woman convicted of poisoning her husband
Fred Ridgeway (1953–2012), Irish-born stage and television actor
Frederick Ridgeway (1848–1921), Anglican bishop from 1901 until his death 20 years later
Fritzi Ridgeway (1898–1961), American actress of the silent era
Greg Ridgeway (born 1973), American criminologist
Hassan Ridgeway (born 1994), American football defensive tackle
James Ridgeway (1936–2021), American investigative journalist
Jessica Ridgeway (2002–2012), American murder victim
Joseph West Ridgeway GCB GCMG KCSI PC (1844–1930), British civil servant and colonial governor
Luann Ridgeway (born 1956), citizen-legislator and an attorney
Marian Elizabeth Ridgeway (died 1982), American political scientist
Matthew B. Ridgeway (1895–1993), US general
Peter Ridgeway, Australian prosecutor and a former Deputy Director of Prosecutions in Fiji
Rick Ridgeway (born 1949), mountaineer, adventurer, environmentalist, writer, filmmaker and businessman
Suzanne Ridgeway (1918–1996), American film actress
Thomas Ridgeway, multiple people
West Ridgeway (1844–1930), British civil servant and colonial governor
William Ridgeway (1853–1926), British archaeologist and philologist
William Ridgeway (law reporter) (1765–1817), Irish barrister and law reporter

Fictional characters
Jordan Ridgeway, fictional character on the NBC daytime soap opera Days of Our Lives
Paula Ridgeway, key character in Random Harvest by James Hilton
Ridgeway, key character in The Underground Railroad by Colson Whitehead
Linnet Doyle née Ridgeway, a character in Agatha Christie's novel Death on the Nile

See also
Ridgeway (disambiguation)
Bridgeway (disambiguation)
Ridgway (name)

English-language surnames